Charles Cameron (26 July 1779 Driminasalie, Kilmallie, Inverness-shire, Scotland – 14 May 1827 Chinsurah, near Calcutta, West Bengal, India), was a Scots born soldier. Through his children he is linked with a number of political and other people influential in Australian history.

Military career
Initially serving as a volunteer, he was commissioned an ensign and lieutenant in the 92nd Regiment in 1799, later joining the 3rd Regiment, promoted captain in 1804, major in 1813 and lieutenant-colonel in 1819.

From 14 December 1822, Cameron was appointed commandant of Port Dalrymple, serving from 1 February 1823 – 6 April 1825.

Family
Cameron was the son of Donald and Catherine Cameron. He married Charlotte Euphemia Cameron (1779–1803) in 1800, Mary MacDonnell in 1807 and after her death Luduvina Rosa Da Silva in Portugal in 1812.

After his death, Luduvina married Captain John Finnis in 1832 in Sydney.

The children of Charles and Luduvina included:
Charlotte (1813-1885) married William Hampden Dutton (Sydney 1831)
Julia Anne Ludovina (c. 1820 - 1846)  married Dr George Bennett of Sydney
Ewen Wallace Cameron (1816-1876)
Luduvina (1824-1851) married (Sir) George Strickland Kingston (1841)

References

Van Diemen's Land
Scots Guards officers
People from Lochaber
Charles
1779 births
1827 deaths
Gordon Highlanders officers
British Army personnel of the French Revolutionary Wars
British Army personnel of the Peninsular War
Deaths from cholera
Infectious disease deaths in India
Scottish military personnel